Sushma Verma (born 5 November 1992) is an Indian cricketer. She started her national-level career as a wicket-keeper and right-handed batter in the India women's national cricket team.

After the 2017 Women's Cricket World Cup game, the Himachal Pradesh chief minister Virbhadra Singh offered her a post of Deputy Superintendent of Police.

Early life 
Sushma Verma born on 3 November 1992 in Shimla, Himachal Prasdesh. Her father “Bhopal Singh Verma” wanted her to stay back close to home. But Sushma's choice was to go to “Portmore Govt Model” school in Shimla. From flirting with multiple sports – volleyball, handball, and badminton. she has been a state level player at these games but cricket somehow found its way to load Shusma. (official website)

Domestic cricket 
Before that, she played for the Himachal Pradesh Cricket Association. Under her captaincy, the Himachal team were the runners-up at the Under-19 All-India women's tournament in 2011. She is the first cricketer from Himachal Pradesh, male or female, to represent India in international cricket.

Owing to fewer opportunities in domestic, she started playing for Railways. She played along with Mithali Raj, Harmanpreet Kaur and Punam Raut.

International cricket 
Verma was part of the Indian team to reach the final of the 2017 Women's Cricket World Cup where the team lost to England by nine runs. In the innaugral WPL 2023, she was picked up by Gujarat Giants.

References

External links 

 
 

1992 births
Living people
Cricketers from Himachal Pradesh
Indian women cricketers
India women Test cricketers
India women One Day International cricketers
India women Twenty20 International cricketers
Himachal Pradesh women cricketers
North Zone women cricketers
People from Shimla
Railways women cricketers
Sportswomen from Himachal Pradesh
IPL Velocity cricketers
Gujarat Giants (WPL) cricketers
Wicket-keepers